Amanuel Ghebreigzabhier Egerzeigzaarhka (born 17 August 1994 in Addis Ababa) is an Eritrean cyclist, who currently rides for UCI WorldTeam . In August 2018, he was named in the startlist for the 2018 Vuelta a España. In May 2019, he was named in the startlist for the 2019 Giro d'Italia.

Major results

2014
 National Road Championships
1st  Road race
4th Time trial
 1st  Road race, National Under-23 Road Championships
 1st  Overall Tour de Blida
1st Young rider classification
1st Stage 3
 1st Stage 4 Tour de Constantine
 4th Circuit d'Alger
 6th Overall Tour d'Algérie
1st Young rider classification
2015
 1st  Road race, National Under-23 Road Championships
 1st  Overall Tour de Constantine
1st Young rider classification
 1st  Mountains classification, Tour of Rwanda
 3rd Road race, National Road Championships
 3rd Grand Prix d'Oran
 5th Overall Tour International de Sétif
 8th Overall Tour de Blida
 9th Circuit d'Alger
2016
 African Road Championships
1st  Team time trial
5th Road race
7th Time trial
 3rd Gran Premio Palio del Recioto
 5th Overall Tour of Rwanda
 National Road Championships
5th Road race
5th Time trial
2017
 1st  Team time trial, African Road Championships
 2nd Coppa della Pace
 2nd Giro del Medio Brenta
 6th Overall Tour de Hongrie
1st  Mountains classification
 7th Trofeo Alcide Degasperi
 9th Overall Arctic Race of Norway
2018
 African Road Championships
1st  Road race
1st  Team time trial
 2nd Road race, National Road Championships
 4th Overall Tour de Langkawi
2019
 1st  Time trial, National Road Championships
 6th Overall Vuelta a Burgos
 8th Overall Tour of Austria
2021
 9th Overall Settimana Internazionale di Coppi e Bartali
2022
 3rd Time trial, National Road Championships
 6th Overall Tour des Alpes-Maritimes et du Var

Grand Tour general classification results timeline

References

External links

1994 births
Living people
Eritrean male cyclists
Sportspeople from Addis Ababa
Olympic cyclists of Eritrea
Cyclists at the 2020 Summer Olympics
Ethiopian people of Eritrean descent